The  is a  long suspended railway operated by the Tokyo Metropolitan Bureau of Transportation (Toei). It lies within the Ueno Zoo in Taitō, Tokyo, Japan.  The monorail is similar to the Wuppertal Schwebebahn, but has rubber tires rather than steel wheels.  Many of the parts manufactured for the monorail were off-the-shelf.  The first monorail in the nation (and the first zoo monorail in the world), it has two stations, single track, and operates at 600 V DC. The line began operating on December 17, 1957, was suspended during 2001–2002, and has been suspended since October 31, 2019, with the operator citing the high costs of replacing the aging trains. Being located inside the zoo, it only operated on days when the zoo was open, and between 9:40 a.m. and 4:30 p.m., with departures scheduled every seven minutes. The fare for the 90-second trip was 150 yen.

See also
Monorails in Japan

References

Monorails in Japan
Rail transport in Tokyo
Lines of Tokyo Metropolitan Bureau of Transportation
Suspended monorails
Ueno Park
Railway lines opened in 1957
Defunct monorails
Entertainment monorails